Graham Francis Arthur (9 June 1936 – 10 January 2021) was an Australian rules footballer who played for the Hawthorn Football Club in the Victorian Football League (VFL).

Career
Arthur played primarily as a half forward, debuting while still only 18 years old.

He was the captain of the first Hawthorn side to win the Grand Final and made a dozen appearances for the Victorian state team.  He was named as captain of Hawthorn's official Team of the Century.

Arthur was inducted into the Australian Football Hall of Fame in the initial intake in 1996, his citation reading:
Hawthorn's first premiership captain was a brilliant half-forward flanker/centreman.

Arthur's father Alan Arthur played for Essendon.

On 24 October 2000, Arthur was awarded the Australian Sports Medal for his contribution to Australian football.

Statistics

Coaching statistics

|- style="background-color: #EAEAEA"
| 1964 || 
| 18 || 13 || 5 || 0 || 72.2% || 5 || 12
|- style="background-color: #EAEAEA"
| 1965 || 
| 18 || 4 || 14 || 0 || 22.2% || 12 || 12
|- class="sortbottom"
! colspan=2| Career totals
! 36 !! 17 !! 19 !! 0 !! 47.2%
! colspan=2|
|}

Honours and achievements
Team
 VFL premiership player: 1961
 2× Minor premiership: 1961, 1963

Individual
 VFL premiership captain: 1961
 3× Hawthorn best and fairest: 1955, 1958, 1962
 Hawthorn captain: 1960–1968 (most games played as captain – 153)
 Australian Football Hall of Fame
 Hawthorn Hall of Fame – Legend status
 Hawthorn Team of the Century – Captain
 Hawthorn life member

References

External links
 
 
 
 

1936 births
2021 deaths
Hawthorn Football Club players
Hawthorn Football Club Premiership players
Hawthorn Football Club coaches
Peter Crimmins Medal winners
Australian Football Hall of Fame inductees
Australian rules footballers from Victoria (Australia)
Sandhurst Football Club players
Recipients of the Australian Sports Medal
One-time VFL/AFL Premiership players